Phelsuma abbotti, commonly known as Abbott's day gecko, Aldabra day gecko, or Assumption day gecko, is a species of lizard in the family Gekkonidae.

Geographic range
P. abbotti is found in Madagascar and Seychelles.

Subspecies
Three subspecies are distinguished:
Phelsuma abbotti abbotti  – Aldabra Island day gecko (Aldabra Atoll, the Seychelles)
Phelsuma abbotti chekei  – Cheke's day gecko (Madagascar)
Phelsuma abbotti sumptio  – Assumption Island day gecko (Assumption Island, the Seychelles)

Habitat
The natural habitats of P. abbotti are subtropical or tropical dry forests, subtropical or tropical moist lowland forests, subtropical or tropical mangrove forests, subtropical or tropical dry shrubland, rural gardens, urban areas, and introduced vegetation.

Reproduction
P. abbotti is oviparous.

Etymology
P. abbotti is named after American naturalist William Louis Abbott.

References

Further reading
Stejneger L (1893). "On some collections of reptiles and batrachians from East Africa and the adjacent islands, recently received from Dr. W. L. Abbott and Mr. William Astor Chanler, with descriptions of new species". Proceedings of the United States National Museum 16: 711–741. (Phelsuma abbotti, new species, pp. 716–717).

Phelsuma
Reptiles of Madagascar
Fauna of Seychelles
Reptiles described in 1893
Taxa named by Leonhard Stejneger
Taxonomy articles created by Polbot